Kindersley was a federal electoral district in Saskatchewan, Canada, that was represented in the House of Commons of Canada from 1917 to 1968. It was created in 1914 from Battleford, Moose Jaw and Saskatoon ridings. It was abolished in 1966 when it was redistributed into Battleford—Kindersley and Swift Current—Maple Creek ridings.

Members of Parliament 

This riding elected the following Members of Parliament:

Edward Thomas Wordon Myers, Unionist (1917–1921)
Archibald M. Carmichael, Progressive (1921–1935)
Otto Buchanan Elliott, Social Credit (1935–1940)
Charles Albert Henderson, Liberal (1940–1945)
Frank Eric Jaenicke, Co-operative Commonwealth Federation (1945–1949)
Fred Larson, Liberal (1949–1953)
Merv Johnson, C.C.F. (1953–1958)
Robert Hanbidge, Progressive Conservative (1958–1963)
Reg Cantelon, Progressive Conservative (1963–1968)

Election results

See also 

 List of Canadian federal electoral districts
 Past Canadian electoral districts

External links 
 

Former federal electoral districts of Saskatchewan